The Bihar School of Yoga is a modern school of yoga founded by Satyananda Saraswati in Munger, Bihar, India, in 1963. An Institute of Yogic Studies was created in 1994.

History
The Bihar School of Yoga was established in 1963 at Munger, in the Indian state of Bihar, by Satyananda Saraswati. By the late 1960s, it had expanded to become an international organisation and by the mid-1970s comprised 54 ashrams in various countries.

An institute of Yogic studies was created in 1994.

The school publishes Yoga Magazine. The school teaches traditional yoga in a modern style, for example making use of software apps to distribute knowledge of mantra yoga, hatha yoga, jnana yoga and raja yoga.

Locations
The primary Bihar School of Yoga campus is called Ganga Darshan. It includes residential facilities for guests and students.

Satyananda yoga was taught in many organizations in the world by the mid-1970s, including eight ashrams in Australia, of which 3 were run by sannyasins.

Sexual abuse allegations 

The 2014 public hearing of Case study of Australian Royal Commission into Institutional Responses to Child Sexual Abuse inquired into the response of Satyananda Yoga Ashram (Mangrove Mountain, New South Wales) to allegations of child sexual abuse by the ashram's former spiritual leader, Swami Akhandananda Saraswati, in the 1970s and 1980s. In 2016, the Royal Commission into Institutional Responses to Child Sexual Abuse found that "The Bihar School of Yoga's response did not properly prioritise the welfare of survivors over the interests of the 'brand' of Satyananda yoga."

Awards 
The Prime Minister of India conferred the National Yoga Award 2019 on the Bihar School of Yoga for outstanding contributions to the promotion and development of yoga.

References

External links
 
 Rediscovering yoga

1963 establishments in Bihar
Yoga schools